Devendra pardalis is a species of spider of the family Zoropsidae. It is endemic to Sri Lanka.

See also
 List of Zoropsidae species

References

Zoropsidae
Spiders of Asia
Endemic fauna of Sri Lanka
Spiders described in 1898
Taxa named by Eugène Simon